Robert Macfarlane (born 15 August 1976) is a British writer and Fellow of Emmanuel College, Cambridge.

He is best known for his books on landscape, nature, place, people and language, which include The Old Ways (2012), Landmarks (2015), The Lost Words (2017) and Underland (2019). In 2017 he received  The E. M. Forster Award for Literature from the American Academy of Arts and Letters. He is married to professor of modern Chinese history and literature Julia Lovell.

Early life and education
Macfarlane was born in Halam, Nottinghamshire, and attended Nottingham High School. He was educated at Pembroke College, Cambridge, and Magdalen College, Oxford. He began a PhD at Emmanuel College, Cambridge, in 2000, and in 2001 was elected a Fellow of the college.

Family
His father John Macfarlane is a respiratory physician who co-authored the CURB-65 score of pneumonia in 2003. His brother  James is also a consultant physician in respiratory medicine. He is married to Julia Lovell, and has three children.

Books
Macfarlane's first book, Mountains of the Mind, was published in 2003 and won the Guardian First Book Award, the Somerset Maugham Award, and the Sunday Times Young Writer of the Year Award. It was shortlisted for the Boardman Tasker Prize for Mountain Literature and the John Llewellyn Rhys Prize. It is an account of the development of Western attitudes to mountains and precipitous landscapes, and takes its title from a line by the poet Gerard Manley Hopkins. The book asks why people, including Macfarlane, are drawn to mountains despite their obvious dangers, and examines the powerful and sometimes fatal hold that mountains can come to have over the imagination. The Irish Times described the book as "a new kind of exploration writing, perhaps even the birth of a new genre, which demands a new category of its own."

The Wild Places was published in September 2007, and describes a series of journeys made in search of the wildness that remains in Britain and Ireland. The book won the Boardman Tasker Prize for Mountain Literature, the Scottish Arts Council Non-Fiction Book of the Year Award, and the Grand Prize at the Banff Mountain Festival, North America's equivalent of the Boardman Tasker Prize.

It became a best-seller in Britain and The Netherlands, and was shortlisted for six further prizes, including the Dolman Best Travel Book Award, the Sunday Times Young Writer of the Year Award, the John Llewellyn Rhys Prize, and North America's Orion Book Award, a prize founded "to recognize books that deepen our connection to the natural world, present new ideas about our relationship with nature, and achieve excellence in writing." The Wild Places was adapted for television by the BBC as an episode of the BBC Two Natural World series broadcast in February 2010; the film later won a Wildscreen Award.

The Old Ways: A Journey On Foot, the third in the "loose trilogy of books about landscape and the human heart" begun by Mountains of the Mind and The Wild Places, was published in June 2012. It was acclaimed as a "tour de force" by William Dalrymple in The Observer. The book describes the years Macfarlane spent following "old ways" (pilgrimage paths, sea-roads, prehistoric trackways, ancient rights of way) in south-east England, north-west Scotland, Spain, Sichuan and Palestine. Its guiding spirit is the early-twentieth-century writer and poet, Edward Thomas, and its chief subject is the reciprocal shaping of people and place. The Old Ways was in the bestseller lists for six months.

It was chosen as Book of the Year by John Banville, Philip Pullman, Jan Morris, John Gray, Antony Beevor, and Dan Stevens among others. In the UK it was joint winner of the Dolman Prize for Travel Writing, was shortlisted for The Samuel Johnson Prize (the ‘non-fiction Booker’), the Jan Michalski Prize for World Literature, the Duff-Cooper Prize for Non-Fiction, the Warwick Prize for Writing, the Waterstones Book of the Year Award, and three other prizes. In the US it was shortlisted for the Orion Book Award.

Landmarks, a book that celebrates and defends the language of landscape, was published in the UK in March 2015. A version of its first chapter, published in The Guardian as The Word-Hoard, went viral, and the book became a Sunday Times number one bestseller. It was shortlisted for The Samuel Johnson Prize for non-fiction. Landmarks is described on the cover as "a field guide to the literature of nature, and a vast glossary collecting thousands of the remarkable terms used in dozens of the languages and dialects of Britain and Ireland to describe and denote aspects of terrain, weather, and nature". Each of the book's chapters explores the landscapes and style of a writer or writers, as Macfarlane travels to meet farmers, sailors, walkers, glossarians, artists, poets and others who have developed intense and committing relationships with their chosen places. The chapter of the book concerning Nan Shepherd and the Cairngorm mountains was adapted for television by BBC4 and BBC Scotland. Macfarlane's detailed writing style, and his frequent references to dialect vocabulary, were satirised in a February 2016 edition of Private Eye by Craig Brown in the magazine's regular "Diary" feature. Landmarks was published in the US in August 2016. It was described by Tom Shippey in The Wall Street Journal as a book that "teaches us to love our world, even the parts of it that we have neglected. Mr Macfarlane is the great nature writer, and nature poet, of this generation."

In May 2016 Macfarlane published The Gifts of Reading, a short book about gifts, stories and the unexpected consequences of generosity. All work for the book was given for free, and all moneys raised were donated to MOAS, the Migrant Offshore Aid Station, to save refugee lives.

With the artist Jackie Morris, Macfarlane published The Lost Words: A Spell Book in October 2017. The book became what the Guardian called 'a cultural phenomenon', winning Children's Book of the Year at the British Book Awards jointly with The Hate U Give by Angie Thomas. The "lost" words of the book's title are twenty of the names for everyday nature—from "Acorn" through to "Wren" by way of "Bluebell", "Kingfisher", "Lark" and "Otter"—that were controversially dropped from inclusion in the Oxford Junior Dictionary due to under-use by children. Grassroots campaigns sprang up to raise money to place copies of the book in every primary and special school in all of Scotland, half of England and a quarter of Wales.

Funds were also raised to place a copy in every hospice in Britain. The book is used by charities and carers working with dementia sufferers, refugees, survivors of domestic abuse, childhood cancer patients, and people in terminal care. It has been adapted for dance, outdoor theatre, choral music and classical music. In 2018 the new Royal National Orthopaedic Hospital at Stanmore opened its new building with four levels decorated with art and poems from The Lost Words. It was the inspiration for Spell Songs, a folk music concert and album by musicians including Karine Polwart, Julie Fowlis and Kris Drever.

Underland: A Deep Time Journey was published in May 2019. It is a book about the deep-time pasts and futures of the Earth, as revealed by mythical underworlds and real subterranean journeys. The book was serialized on BBC Radio 4 as the Book of the Week for 29 April - 3 May 2019.

Film

In collaboration with the director Jen Peedom, the cinematographer Renan Ozturk and the composer Richard Tognetti, Macfarlane worked on the film Mountain, which premiered with a live performance from the Australian Chamber Orchestra at the Sydney Opera House in June 2017. Macfarlane's script was voiced by Willem Dafoe. Mountain became the highest-grossing Australian documentary of all time, and won three Australian Academy Awards.

With the Oscar-nominated composer Hauschka and the director Rob Petit, Macfarlane made Upstream, a film set in the Cairngorm mountains in winter.

Macfarlane's 2012 book Holloway was adapted into a short film shot on Super-8 by the film-maker Adam Scovell.

Background
Macfarlane is a nature writer in the broadest sense, part of a tradition of writing about landscape, place, travel, and nature that includes John Muir, Richard Jefferies and Edward Thomas, as well as contemporary figures such as John McPhee, Rebecca Solnit, Annie Dillard, Barry Lopez and his friend Roger Deakin. He is associated with other walker-writers including Patrick Leigh Fermor, Nan Shepherd and Laurie Lee, and seen as one of a number of recent British writers who have provoked a new critical and popular interest in writing about landscape. His interests in topography, ecology and the environment have been explored in his books but also through essays, notably his Common Ground series which was published in The Guardian in 2005.

He has also published many reportage and travel essays in magazines, especially Granta and Archipelago, as well as numerous introductory essays to reissues of lost and neglected classics of landscape and nature writing from the nineteenth and twentieth centuries, notably J. A. Baker (The Peregrine) and Nan Shepherd (The Living Mountain and In The Cairngorms).

Campaigns
In 2018 Macfarlane co-edited, with Chris Packham and Patrick Barkham, A People's Manifesto For Wildlife, arguing for urgent and large-scale change in Britain's relationship with nature. 10,000 people marched on Whitehall to deliver The Manifesto to DEFRA. He has been involved with the Sheffield tree-protectors campaign, fighting the unnecessary felling of thousands of street trees in the city. Macfarlane wrote 'Heartwood', a poem for the protestors, which was set to music, flyposted and subvertised across Sheffield, and hung as a 'charm' around endangered trees.

He is a patron of the Outdoor Swimming Society, the Outlandia Project, ONCA (One Network for Conservation and the Arts), and Gateway To Nature, a Lottery-funded mental-health initiative designed to improve access to nature for vulnerable groups and individuals. He is a founding Trustee of the charity Action For Conservation, which works to inspire a lifelong engagement with conservation in 12–17 year olds, working especially with schools with high pupil premium levels.

Collaborations
Most of Macfarlane's books have been jacketed with original work by the artist Stanley Donwood, known for his close association with the band Radiohead, exceptions include his book The Lost Words, for example, which was illustrated by Jackie Morris. Macfarlane also collaborated with Donwood and writer Dan Richards on Holloway, published in an edition of 277 by Quive-Smith Press in 2012, and a trade edition by Faber & Faber in May 2013, which became a Sunday Times best-seller. Macfarlane and Donwood collaborated on an edition of Thomas Hardy's poems published by The Folio Society in 2021. Macfarlane selected and introduced 109 poems for the edition with Donwood providing the illustrations.

In June 2012, Macfarlane wrote the libretto to a "jazz opera" called Untrue Island, composed by the double-bassist Arnie Somogyi, and performed in a former nuclear weapons storage site on Orford Ness in Suffolk.

His work has been involved with the music of contemporary musicians including Johnny Flynn, Frank Turner, The Memory Band, Grasscut, Julie Fowlis and Karine Polwart. He co-wrote the song Coins for Eyes with Flynn for the 9th series of the BBC programme Digging for Britain.

Awards and honours
 2003 Guardian First Book Award, winner, Mountains of the Mind
 2004 Somerset Maugham Award, winner, Mountains of the Mind
 2004 Sunday Times Young Writer of the Year Award, winner, Mountains of the Mind
 2007 Boardman-Tasker Prize For Mountain Literature, winner, The Wild Places
 2008 Scottish Non-Fiction Book of the Year Award, winner, The Wild Places
 2008 Grand Prize Banff Mountain Festival, winner, The Wild Places
 2011 Philip Leverhulme Prize in Modern European Languages and Literature
 2012 Samuel Johnson Prize, shortlist, The Old Ways
 2013 Jan Michalski Prize for Literature, finalist, The Old Ways
 2013 Warwick Prize for Writing, shortlist, The Old Ways
 2013 Dolman Best Travel Book Award, winner, The Old Ways
 2015 Hay Festival Medal for Prose, Landmarks
 2015 Samuel Johnson Prize, shortlist, Landmarks
 2017 Children's Book of the Year, British Book Awards, The Lost Words
 2017 EM Forster Award for Literature, American Academy of Arts and Letters
2019 Wainwright Prize, Underland
2019 NDR Kultur Sachbuchpreis, Underland

Bibliography

Books

Book reviews

References

External links
Robert Macfarlane at Emmanuel College, Cambridge

English people of Scottish descent
Fellows of the Royal Society of Literature
Alumni of Magdalen College, Oxford
Alumni of Pembroke College, Cambridge
People educated at Nottingham High School
Boardman Tasker Prize winners
British nature writers
British travel writers
Fellows of Emmanuel College, Cambridge
Living people
1976 births
English male non-fiction writers
20th-century English male writers
English non-fiction outdoors writers